Abraham Stringel Vallejo (born May 3, 1988) is a Mexican former professional footballer who most recently played for Alianza Petrolera.

References

Mexican footballers
1988 births
Living people
Place of birth missing (living people)
Association football defenders
Correcaminos UAT footballers
Indios de Ciudad Juárez footballers
Alianza Petrolera players
Tecos F.C. footballers
Atlético San Luis footballers
Venados F.C. players
Club Celaya footballers
Cimarrones de Sonora players